Jonas Rickaert (born 7 February 1994 in Waregem) is a Belgian cyclist, who currently rides for UCI ProTeam .

Major results

2011
 1st Stage 4 Coupe du Président de la Ville de Grudziadz
2012
 1st Overall Coupe du Président de la Ville de Grudziadz
1st Stage 1b
 2nd Overall Keizer der Juniores
1st Stage 2a (ITT)
2013
 10th GP Briek Schotte
2014
 3rd Overall Tour de Gironde
2017
 1st Grote Prijs Marcel Kint
 9th Primus Classic
2018
 5th Gooikse Pijl
 6th Tour de l'Eurométropole
 8th Scheldeprijs
 8th Tro-Bro Léon
 10th Overall Danmark Rundt
 10th Chrono des Nations
2020
 1st Dwars door het Hageland
 10th Three Days of Bruges–De Panne
2021
 3rd Heistse Pijl
 4th Dwars door het Hageland

Grand Tour general classification results timeline

References

External links

1994 births
Living people
Belgian male cyclists
People from Waregem
Sportspeople from West Flanders
21st-century Belgian people